Events from the year 1799 in Ireland.

Incumbent
Monarch: George III

Events
24 January – A motion to debate an Act of Union is defeated in the Irish House of Commons, though it is later approved in the House of Lords
9 February – around 91 die when a barge capsizes at the bridge at Carrick-on-Suir.
15 February – the rebel guerilla leader Michael Dwyer escapes from a gun battle with British troops at Miley Connell's cottage, Dernamuck, in the Glen of Imaal, Wicklow. (today called the Dwyer–McAllister Cottage)
River Shannon made navigable from Limerick to Killaloe.

Births
28 February – William Dargan, engineer and railway builder (died 1867).
9 August – Henry Maxwell, 7th Baron Farnham, politician and peer (died 1868).
12 August – Patrick MacDowell, sculptor (died 1870).
22 December – Nicholas Callan, priest and scientist (died 1864).
26 December – William Kennedy, Scottish poet, journalist and diplomat (died 1871 in France).
Full date unknown
Henry Archer, barrister and entrepreneur in north Wales (died 1863 in France).
Joseph M. Hawkins, Alamo defender (died 1836 in the United States).

Deaths
11 January – Thomas Bermingham, 1st Earl of Louth (born 1717)
27 February – Sir John Blackwood, 2nd Baronet, politician (born 1722).
29 March – Charles Bingham, 1st Earl of Lucan, High Sheriff of Mayo in 1756 (born 1735)
4 June – Philip Woodroffe, surgeon
4 August – James Caulfeild, 1st Earl of Charlemont, politician, first President of the Royal Irish Academy, president of the volunteer convention in Dublin, 1783 (born 1728).
6 December – John Moore, participant in Irish Rebellion of 1798, proclaimed President of the Government of the Province of Connaught (born 1767).
11 December – "Brave" Charles Edward Jennings de Kilmaine, soldier in France (born 1751; died in France).

References

 
Years of the 18th century in Ireland
Ireland
1790s in Ireland